Loxoceras is a genus of orthocerids of uncertain affinity, the shell of which is a smooth orthocone with the siphuncle between the center and probably the venter.  Type species: Orthocera breyni Fleming 1928. May be equivalent to Breynioceras Foerse 1939. Loxoceras has been found in Lower Carboniferous marine strata in Europe

References

 Walter C Sweet, 1964. Nautiloidea - Orthocerida; Treatise on Invertebrate Paleontology, Part K. Geological Society of America and University of Kansas Press.

Prehistoric nautiloid genera